Gerald Isaac Lobo is the bishop of the Roman Catholic Diocese of Udupi. He is born and brought up in the Agrar. A small town in Dakshina Kannada district. He was born on 12 November 1949.

Priestly life
Bishop Gerald was ordained as a priest on November 12, 1977. After Ordaining as a priest he served as Assistant parish priest and as Parish priest in the various Parishes of Mangalore. Then he was appointed as the director of "CODP".After this he was assigned with responsibility as the episcopal vicar of Kasaragod in Kerala. On March 20, 2000, he was ordained as a Bishop of Shivamoga by then Arch Bishop of Bangalore Ignatius Paul Pinto. After leading the Diocese of Shivamoga for 17 years he was appointed as the first Bishop of Udupi.

References

 "Bishop Gerald Isaac Lobo",http://www.catholic-hierarchy.org/
 "Bishop Gerald Isaac Lobo"

1948 births
21st-century Roman Catholic bishops in India
Living people